Sheikh Hasina Cantonment is the headquarter of 7th Infantry Division of Bangladesh Army. It is located in Lebukhali, Patuakhali. The area of the cantonment is 1532 acres. The project will be completed by the Ministry of Defence by June 2021.

History 
The "Sheikh Hasina Cantonment" will be established as part of the governments long-term modernization scheme for Bangladesh Armed Forces called the "Forces Goal 2030".

Prime Minister Sheikh Hasina green lighted the project in 2014. She first announced it during a winter exercise of Bangladesh Armed Forces on January 16, 2015.

The Executive Committee of the National Economic Council approved the project ‘Establishment of Sheikh Hasina Cantonment, Barisal’ on November 14, 2017. The set up of this cantonment will cost approximately Tk 1,699 crore.

On February 8, 2018, Prime Minister Sheikh Hasina inaugurated  the cantonment.

References 

Cantonments of Bangladesh